Taptapadi is an Indian period film inspired by Rabindranath Tagore's short story Drustidaan. It is directed by Sachin Balram Nagargoje and stars Kashyap Parulekar, Veena Jamkar, Shruti Marathe, Neena Kulkarni, Sharad Ponkshe, Ambarish Deshpande, and Ashwini Ekbote in lead roles. The film was released 28 March 2014.

Synopsis 
Meera falls in love with her cousin and even gets married to him. Their marital bliss, however, is dampened when she suffers a miscarriage and begins losing her eyesight.

Cast
 Kashyap Parulekar as Madhav
 Veena Jamkar as Meera 
 Shruti Marathe as Sunanda 
 Neena Kulkarni as Durgabai 
 Sharad Ponkshe
 Ambarish Deshpande
 Ashwini Ekbote

Critical reception 
Taptapadi movie received negative reviews from critics. A Reviewer of Loksatta says "Atya, played by Neena Kulkarni, is also a bit emotional. Veena Jamkar's performance is the strength of this film". Soumitra Pote of  Maharashtra Times wrote "Overall.. We should expect good movies from this director in future. In the very first film, he has taken up a very heavy and fluid subject. He has a lot to learn from this experience. Not a bad start for him". A Reviewer of Divya Marathi wrote "This is a magnificent failed attempt in Marathi. Veena Jamkar, except for the portrayal skills, there is not much in the film to hold the audience".

References

External links
 
 

Films based on works by Rabindranath Tagore
2010s Marathi-language films